The Proyecto Tití ("Project Tamarin") was founded in 1985, to provide information to assist in conservation of the cottontop tamarin (Saguinus oedipus) and their habitat in the tropical forests of Colombia. Proyecto Tití's programs combine field research, education and community programs. The cotton-top tamarin, is one of the most endangered primates in the world and is found only in North-Western Colombia.

Programs

Research
Techniques such as radio telemetry, capture and release, hair dye allow Proyecto Tití's field researchers to identify individual tamarins and locate the groups.

Forest Protection
Proyecto Tití is working on projects to purchase land that contains the last contiguous forest in Northwestern Colombia suitable for cottontop survival. The project also works with local communities to restore and protect existing forest.

Clay Bindes
Clay bindes are small stoves made from termite mounds that help reduce the amount of firewood required by cooking over traditional open fires and thus reducing deforestation.

Eco-Mochila Project
The Eco-Mochila is a community-led project that works to take discarded trash and transform it into useful products. One example is plastic bags being transformed into colorfully designed, hand-knit mochilas (tote bags). The trash is recognized as a threat to the cottontop and other animals that may ingest them.

Conservation Education
The primary focus of Proyecto Tití is conservation education. The team educates local schoolchildren and adults about the forest environment and endemic animals and the threats they face.

See also

 Wildlife Conservation Network
 Conservation movement
 Environmental movement
 Natural environment
 Sustainability

References

External links 

 Proyecto Tití Website
  Wildlife Conservation Network Website

Primatology
Organizations established in 1985
International environmental organizations
Endangered animals
Animal conservation organizations
Conservation projects
Mammal conservation
Animal welfare organisations based in Colombia
1985 establishments in Colombia